Danny Wade Dumaresque (born November 6, 1959) is a Canadian politician. He represented the riding of Eagle River in the Newfoundland and Labrador House of Assembly from 1989 to 1996 as a member of the Liberal Party. Dumaresque has been a Director of NL Hydro and an outspoken critic of the Muskrat Falls hydro development. Dumaresque is founder of Labrador Gem Seafoods.

In the 1996 election, Dumaresque defeated Yvonne Jones for the Liberal nomination in the redistricted riding of Cartwright-L'Anse au Clair. Jones ran as an independent candidate, however, and defeated Dumaresque in the general election. She later joined the Liberal caucus.

He later served as John Efford's campaign manager in the party's leadership convention in 2001. He subsequently threatened to sue the victorious candidate, Roger Grimes, for libel after Grimes reportedly stated that he "would never be able to sleep any one night in comfort, knowing he had a minister in confidence who had Danny Dumaresque as an advisor to him." Premier Grimes issued and official apology stating there was no basis for his statement and Mr. Dumaresque dropped his suit.

He also served as president of the provincial Liberal Party from 2006 until 2009. He was succeeded in this role by Judy Morrow.

Dumaresque ran as the Liberal candidate in Torngat Mountains in the 2007 election, but narrowly lost to Patty Pottle.

He was also frequently rumoured as a possible candidate for the leadership of the provincial Liberal party in their 2010 leadership election. After he had previously stated that he would not rule it out, on July 29, 2010 he announced he would not run and would instead focus on his business career. Dumaresque has owned and operated seafood processing plants in Quebec and Newfoundland and successfully marketed various seafood products to the international marketplace.

In March 2011, he announced that he was considering running for the Liberals in the 2011 provincial election in the district of Lake Melville, but on August 22, 2011, he was acclaimed as the party's candidate in The Isles of Notre Dame and lost in the general election. He was an unsuccessful candidate in the leadership election to replace Yvonne Jones in August 2011.

On July 2, 2013 Dumaresque announced he was running for the leadership of the provincial Liberal Party in their 2013 election. He was, again, ultimately unsuccessful in his bid to lead the party.

Dumaresque ran for the Liberal nomination in Cartwright-L'Anse au Clair for the 2015 provincial election but lost to Lisa Dempster. He later won a party nomination in Conception Bay East – Bell Island, but lost to the Progressive Conservative incumbent, David Brazil.

Electoral record

|-

|-

|-

|NDP
|Tree Walsh
|align="right"|252
|align="right"|6.17%
|align="right"|
|}

|-

|-

|-

|}

|-

|Independent
|Yvonne Jones
|align="right"|1,665
|align="right"|56.83%
|align="right"|
|-

|-

|}

|-

|-

|-

|NDP
|Jessie Bird
|align="right"|293
|align="right"|12.43%
|align="right"|
|}

|-

|-

|}

References

1959 births
Living people
Liberal Party of Newfoundland and Labrador MHAs
Franco-Newfoundlander people
People from Labrador